Can Yücel (August 21, 1926 – August 12, 1999) was a Turkish poet noted for his use of colloquial language.

Biography
Can Yücel was the son of a former Minister of National Education, Hasan Âli Yücel, who left his mark on the history of education in Turkey, and a grandchild of an Ottoman sea captain who perished with the frigate Ertuğrul. He studied Latin and Ancient Greek at Ankara University and Cambridge. He later worked as a translator at several embassies and in the Turkish language section five years of the BBC in London. After his return to Turkey in 1958, he briefly worked as a tourist guide in Bodrum and Marmaris and then lived in Istanbul, where he worked as a freelance translator and started writing poetry.

Yucel was a poet with a keen political and social awareness. His poetry thrives on a strong combination of lyricism, jovial irony, and sarcasm. Because of his strongly critical poems, he was imprisoned several times. Yucel was certainly one of the most prominent and controversial translators in Turkey. His major poetry collections include Bir Siyasinin Şiirleri (Poems of a Political Prisoner / 1974), Sevgi Duvarı (Wall of Love / 1973), Ölüm ve Oğlum (Death and My Son / 1976), Gökyokuş (Steep Heaven / 1984), Canfeda (Life Offering / 1988), Çok Bi Çocuk (The Child Colors the Man / 1988), Mekânım Datça Olsun (Let Datça Be My Domicile / 1999) and Rengâhenk (Col'armony / 1991).

In his later years, he settled in the remote peninsular town of Datça in southwestern Turkey, where he died of throat cancer. His tomb is much visited. He had two daughters, Güzel and Su, and a son, Hasan, from his marriage to Güler Yücel.

Literary style
Can Yücel was known for using slang and vulgar language in his poems. However, even his critics agreed that his skill in using words in a simple and understandable way is worthy of praise and appreciation. The main themes and inspirational sources in his poems are nature, people, events, concepts, excitements, perceptions, and emotions. His family was of utmost importance to him and his loved ones are mentioned in many of his poems, such as "To my Little Daughter Su," "To Güzel," and "I Loved My Father the Most in Life."

Yücel also translated the works of Shakespeare, Lorca and Brecht into Turkish and his creative rendering of these authors are classics in their own right in Turkey.

Extract of Poem 

Oyunbozan bir akşamın altında,
Elinde bir yoyo gibi benliğin,
Senden damlara, damlardan geriye
Bir kadeh tutuştururlar eline derken.

References

External links

 Selected poems in English

A short biography
Hayatı Ve Şiirleri
Can Yücel
Şiirleri - Poems
Şiirleri - Poems

1926 births
1999 deaths
Turkish male poets
Turkish former Muslims
Turkish atheism activists
Turkish Marxists
Turkish communists
Writers from Istanbul
Turkish translators
Ankara University alumni
Alumni of the University of Cambridge
20th-century translators
20th-century Turkish poets
Deaths from throat cancer
Deaths from cancer in Turkey